Laura H. Goldstein is Professor of Clinical Neuropsychology at King's College London, and Honorary Consultant Clinical Psychologist at the Lishman Unit, South London and Maudsley NHS Foundation Trust.

Bibliography

Selected articles
 Frangou, Sophia, Stuart Donaldson, Michael Hadjulis, Sabine Landau, and Laura H. Goldstein. "The Maudsley Bipolar Disorder Project: executive dysfunction in bipolar disorder I and its clinical correlates." Biological psychiatry 58, no. 11 (2005): 859–864. 
 Baron-Cohen, Simon John Harrison, Laura H. Goldstein, and Maria Wyke. "Coloured speech perception: Is synaesthesia what happens when modularity breaks down?." Perception-London-22 (1993): 419-419. 
Goldstein, Laura H., Sarah Bernard, Peter B. Fenwick, Paul W. Burgess, and Jane McNeil. "Unilateral frontal lobectomy can produce strategy application disorder." Journal of Neurology, Neurosurgery & Psychiatry 56, no. 3 (1993): 274–276.

References

 

Year of birth missing (living people)
Living people
Academics of King's College London
British women academics
British psychologists